Sabrina Lum (born 24 May 1971) is an American swimmer who represented Chinese Taipei at the 1988 Summer Olympics in three events. Lum grew up in Monterey, California, and was a senior at Monterey High School during her participation in the Olympics. She later attended the University of California, San Diego, where she was a member of the UC San Diego Tritons women's swim team.

References

External links
 
Photo of Lum (third from left) with teammates Lin Kuo-wei, Lin Kuo-chung, and Kim Chen in Taipei, 10 June 1988, by Central News Agency, via Ministry of Culture

1971 births
Living people
Sportspeople from Monterey, California
Swimmers from California
Taiwanese female freestyle swimmers
Olympic swimmers of Taiwan
Swimmers at the 1988 Summer Olympics
University of California, San Diego alumni
Place of birth missing (living people)